The 2018–19 season was the 118th season in Società Sportiva Lazio's history and their 31st consecutive season in the top-flight of Italian football. Lazio competed in Serie A, the Coppa Italia and the Europa League.

The season was coach Simone Inzaghi's third in charge of the club, having led Lazio to consecutive fifth-placed finishes in the 2016–17 and 2017–18 seasons. Lazio won the 2018–19 Coppa Italia 2–0 over Atalanta, winning their seventh title overall.

Players

Squad information

Transfers

In

Loans in

Out

Loans out

Pre-season and friendlies

Competitions

Serie A

League table

Results summary

Results by round

Matches

Coppa Italia

UEFA Europa League

Group stage

Knockout phase

Round of 32

Statistics

Appearances and goals

|-
! colspan=14 style="background:#B2FFFF; text-align:center"| Goalkeepers

|-
! colspan=14 style="background:#B2FFFF; text-align:center"| Defenders

|-
! colspan=14 style="background:#B2FFFF; text-align:center"| Midfielders

|-
! colspan=14 style="background:#B2FFFF; text-align:center"| Forwards

|-
! colspan=14 style="background:#B2FFFF; text-align:center"| Players transferred out during the season

Goalscorers

Last updated: 26 May 2019

Clean sheets

Last updated: 20 January 2019

Disciplinary record

Last updated: 20 January 2019

References

S.S. Lazio seasons
Lazio
Lazio